Flattnitz Pass (el. 1400 m.) is a high mountain pass in the Austrian Alps.

The pass is located in the state of Carinthia, connecting Glödnitz in the Gurk valley with Stadl on the Mur river, beyond the border with Styria. The pass height comprises a dispersed settlement with a high-altitude sanatorium (Luftkurort) and an Alpine lake (Flattnitzer See). It is a popular destination for hikers and for cross-country skiers in winter.

The pass was possibly known in Roman times, it was first mentioned in an 898 deed issued by the Carolingian emperor Arnulf. In 1173 the Gurk bishops had a Romanesque chapel erected, dedicated to St John the Baptist, which was rebuilt as a parish church with an adjacent hospice building about 1330. The bishops used Flattnitz (from Slovene: blato, "moss") as a summer residence. The pass height was devastated by invading Ottoman forces in 1478. In the 17th century, Flattnitz was a mining area for silver, iron ore, and lead.

External links
 Profile on climbbybike.com

Mountain passes of the Alps
Mountain passes of Carinthia (state)
Mountain passes of Styria